László Réczi (born 1947) is a Hungarian wrestler. He was born in Kiskunfélegyháza. He won an Olympic bronze medal in Greco-Roman wrestling in 1976. He won a gold medal at the 1977 World Wrestling Championships.

References

External links
 

1947 births
Living people
Olympic wrestlers of Hungary
Wrestlers at the 1972 Summer Olympics
Wrestlers at the 1976 Summer Olympics
Hungarian male sport wrestlers
Olympic bronze medalists for Hungary
Olympic medalists in wrestling
Medalists at the 1976 Summer Olympics
20th-century Hungarian people